Krunoslav and its contraction Kruno is a Croatian male given name. Notable people with this name include:

 Krunoslav Babić (1875–1953), Croatian zoologist
 Krunoslav Draganović (1903–1983), Bosnian Croat priest and Ustaše functionary 
 Krunoslav Hulak (1951–2015), Croatian chess player
 Kruno Ivančić (born 1994), Croatian football player
 Krunoslav Jurčić (born 1969), Croatian football manager and player
 Krunoslav Lovrek (born 1979), Croatian football player
 Kruno Prijatelj (1922–1998), Croatian art historian
 Krunoslav Rendulić (born 1973), Croatian football manager and player
 Krunoslav Simon (born 1985), Croatian basketball player
 Krunoslav Sekulic (born 1961), Austrian ice hockey player
 Krunoslav Slabinac (1944–2020), Croatian pop singer

Croatian masculine given names